Ekaterina Olegovna Lyubushkina (née Bogacheva; born 2 January 1990) is a Russian volleyball player. She was part of the Russia women's national volleyball team that won the European title in 2015.

References

External links

 

1990 births
Living people
Russian women's volleyball players
Universiade medalists in volleyball
Universiade gold medalists for Russia
Medalists at the 2017 Summer Universiade
Sportspeople from Volgograd
20th-century Russian women
21st-century Russian women